Midøya (sometimes called Mia) is an island in Molde Municipality in Møre og Romsdal county, Norway. The  island sits at the entrance to the Romsdalsfjorden between the islands of Dryna and Otrøya. Until 1965, the island was divided between the municipalities of Sør-Aukra and Vatne. The Midsund Bridge connects this island to the village of Midsund on the neighboring island of Otrøya.

Name
The Old Norse form of the name was Miðja. The name is identical with the word miðja which means "in the middle". The island lies between the two other islands of Dryna and Otrøya - but it could also refer to the fact that the island was an important border mark between the district of Sunnmøre (and the Gulating assembly) and the district of Romsdal (and the Frostating assembly). It was mentioned as the dividing place in the historic Historia Norvegiae, and it continued to be the dividing line until 1965 when the dividing line was moved upon the creation of Midsund Municipality.

See also
List of islands of Norway

References

Molde
Islands of Møre og Romsdal